Agriculture is a significant sector in Wisconsin's economy, producing nearly $104 billion in revenue annually. The significance of the state's agricultural production is exemplified by the depiction of a Holstein cow, an ear of corn, and a wheel of cheese on Wisconsin's state quarter design. In 2017 there were 64,800 farms in the state, operating across 14.3 million acres of land.

Overview 
The climate and topography of Wisconsin is favorable to both arable crops and livestock grazing. Wisconsin's soil was ground up over thousand of years during the Wisconsin glaciation, creating soil that is good for crops. The state has a short growing season, but lacks much of the natural disasters that threaten crops. Wisconsin's winters allow cool weather crops to be grown, including potatoes and cranberries. Corn and soybeans, warm weather crops, can still grow well during the summers.

Leading products 
Wisconsin leads the United States in the production of corn for silage, cranberries, ginseng, and snap beans for processing. The state grows more than half the national crop of cranberries, and 97% of the nation's ginseng. Wisconsin is also a leading producer of oats, potatoes, carrots, tart cherries, maple syrup, and sweet corn for processing.

Dairy 

Wisconsin produces about a quarter of America's cheese, leading the nation in cheese production. It is second in milk production, after California, and third in per-capita milk production, behind California and Vermont. Wisconsin is second in butter production, producing about one-quarter of the nation's butter.

Cranberries 
Wisconsin produces 60% of America's cranberries. In 2016, the state grew 6.13 million barrels of cranberries from over 20,000 acres of cranberry fields.

History 
The indigenous people of Wisconsin farmed a variety of vegetables and maize. The Oneota were the first people to farm intensively, around the Mississippi River. In year 1000, the Oneota, much like other Native Americans, were farming the Three Sisters—maize, beans, and squash. Aztalan State Park is the location of one of the farming towns built at this time. In the 1600s, prior to the arrival of Europeans, the population reached approximately 100,000.

Wisconsin was a frontier to many people in the Northeastern states—offering lots of fresh land for cheap. In the mid-19th century, Wisconsin's population increased from 11,683 in 1836, to 210,546 in 1848, many of whom were farmers. Prior to this influx of settlers, farms in Wisconsin mainly produced wheat. At this time, Wisconsin was producing about a sixth of the wheat grown in the country. However, this production could not last, and due to the worsening of soil, and chinch bugs, Wisconsin wheat farmers abandoned the crop and turned to raising dairy cattle and growing feed crops.

In the northern region of the state, farmers grew cranberries. Cranberries are well suited to Wisconsin—not needing hot temperatures, growing in marshlands, and resistant to the extreme cold. Cranberries need little care, and are easy to grow.

The settlers brought their knowledge of the dairy industry with them, realizing the potential of Wisconsin as good farmland. Many of these settlers were from New York, which was the highest producer of dairy products at the time. Additionally, cheesemaking was brought to Wisconsin by the numerous European immigrants at this time.

In the second half of the 19th century, commercial fruit production began in Door County, Wisconsin.

See also 
 1933 Wisconsin milk strike
 Minnesota-Wisconsin price

References

Sources 

 

Agriculture in Wisconsin
Economy of Wisconsin